Iron phosphate may refer to:

 Iron(II) phosphate
 Iron(III) phosphate